Granite State Electric Company is a regulated company that provides electricity in parts of the American state of New Hampshire. Since 2012, it has been owned by Liberty Utilities. The company is headquartered in Salem, New Hampshire.

References

External links

 BusinessWeek profile

Companies based in New Hampshire
Companies based in Rockingham County, New Hampshire
Electric power companies of the United States
Salem, New Hampshire